The following is a comprehensive discography of Riot, an American heavy metal/hard rock band.

Albums

Studio albums

Live albums

Compilation albums

EP

Heavy metal group discographies
Discographies of American artists